Israel Carlos Garcia (born May 12, 1970) is a Puerto Rican former professional boxer who competed from 1998 to 2010. He has 20 wins out of 23 matches.

Professional career
On September 25, 2008 Garcia was knocked out by Mexican American Cristobal Arreola in the third round. That didn't stop him from pursuing his career as a professional boxer.

Professional record

|- style="margin:0.5em auto; font-size:95%;"
|align="center" colspan=8|20 Wins (11 knockouts), 3 Losses, 0 Draw
|- style="margin:0.5em auto; font-size:95%;"
|align=center style="border-style: none none solid solid; background: #e3e3e3"|Res.
|align=center style="border-style: none none solid solid; background: #e3e3e3"|Record
|align=center style="border-style: none none solid solid; background: #e3e3e3"|Opponent
|align=center style="border-style: none none solid solid; background: #e3e3e3"|Type
|align=center style="border-style: none none solid solid; background: #e3e3e3"|Rd., Time
|align=center style="border-style: none none solid solid; background: #e3e3e3"|Date
|align=center style="border-style: none none solid solid; background: #e3e3e3"|Location
|align=center style="border-style: none none solid solid; background: #e3e3e3"|Notes
|-align=center
|Win || 20-3-0 ||align=left| Brett Smith
|DQ || 3 , (0:50) || March 31, 2010 || align=left|Trusts Stadium, Auckland, New Zealand
|align=left|Smith disqualified for Headbutting & wrestling
|-align=center
|Loss || 19-3-0 ||align=left| Denis Boytsov
|TKO || 2 (1:17) || February 2, 2009 || align=left|Rostock, Mecklenburg-Vorpommern, Germany
|align=left|vacant WBA Inter-Continental heavyweight title
|-align=center
|Loss || 19-2-0 || align=left| Cristobal Arreola
|TKO || 3 (1:11) || September 25, 2008 || align=left|Soboba Casino, San Jacinto, California
|align=left|WBC Continental Americas heavyweight title
|-align=center

References

External links

1970 births
Living people
Puerto Rican male boxers
Heavyweight boxers